Roger de Montbegon (Roger de Mumbezon, Roger de Mont Begon) (died 1226) was a landowner in northern England (especially or particularly Lancashire), baron of Hornby, and one of Magna Carta sureties.

Though Matthew Paris does not list him among his list of the sureties, several scholars have concluded that he appears there under the erroneous name of 'Roger de Mowbray'.

Notes

12th-century births
Year of birth unknown
1226 deaths
12th-century English people
13th-century English people
Anglo-Normans
Magna Carta barons
People from Lancaster, Lancashire
English feudal barons